King's Meaburn is a civil parish in the Eden District, Cumbria, England.  It contains twelve listed buildings that are recorded in the National Heritage List for England.  All the listed buildings are designated at Grade II, the lowest of the three grades, which is applied to "buildings of national importance and special interest".  The parish contains the village of King's Meaburn and the surrounding countryside.  The listed buildings comprise houses, farmhouses, farm buildings, a school, a former mill, a telephone kiosk, and three boundary stone.


Buildings

References

Citations

Sources

Lists of listed buildings in Cumbria